"Twin" is a song by American rapper Roddy Ricch, released on November 14, 2022, as the third single from his third mixtape Feed Tha Streets III (2022). It features American rapper Lil Durk and was produced by Teddy Walton, Aaron Bow and Byrd.

Content
Lyrically, the song finds Roddy Ricch referencing his travels, including "shutting down the currency exchange" in London, and encourages Kim Kardashian to rekindle her relationship with Kanye West. In his verse, Lil Durk raps aggressively and demands for rapper Pooh Shiesty's release from prison.

Music video
The music video premiered on November 21, 2022. Directed by Jerry Production, it sees Roddy Ricch and Lil Durk riding side by side in matching cars through the streets at night, hanging out the passenger seat windows, and shopping as retail therapy in a designer streetwear store. The rappers also dance and flaunt their luxuries.

Charts

References

2022 singles
2022 songs
Roddy Ricch songs
Lil Durk songs
Songs written by Roddy Ricch
Songs written by Lil Durk
Songs written by Teddy Walton
Atlantic Records singles